Beeswax: Some B-Sides 1977–1982 is a compilation album by English rock band XTC, released in November 1982 by Virgin Records. It was initially released as a "free bonus album" shrinkwrapped  with the A-side collection Waxworks: Some Singles 1977-1982.

Critical reception
Trouser Press considered the album "not deathless music, but inventive as always and decidedly unpretentious." In a retrospective review, AllMusic felt that while XTC's B-sides were "often as engaging as the A-sides, their addition to the CDs as bonus tracks now makes this collection redundant."

Track listing

Personnel
XTC
Andy Partridge – guitar, vocals
Colin Moulding – bass, vocals
Barry Andrews – keyboards (1-5)
Terry Chambers – drums
Dave Gregory – guitar, keyboards (6-13)

Technical
John Leckie – producer, engineer (1-3, 5)
Robert John "Mutt" Lange – producer (4)
Steve Lillywhite – producer (6-8)
Andy Partridge – producer (9), remix (13)
Hugh Padgham – producer (10-13), engineer (6-8, 10-13)
XTC – producer (10-13)
Bill Price – engineer (4)
Laurence Burrage – engineer (9)
Tony Cousins – mastering

References

B-side compilation albums
XTC compilation albums
1982 compilation albums
Virgin Records compilation albums